Hamburg is an unincorporated community in Avoyelles Parish, Louisiana, United States. The ZIP Code for Hamburg is 71339.

Etymology
A group of the early settlers being natives of Germany caused the name Hamburg to be selected.

References

Unincorporated communities in Avoyelles Parish, Louisiana
Unincorporated communities in Louisiana